Butyn may refer to:

 Butyn, Russia
 Butyn, Ukraine